Elizaveta Ianchuk and Julia Mayr were the defending champions, but both decided not to participate.

Mailen Auroux and María Irigoyen won the title, defeating Elena Bogdan and Réka-Luca Jani in the final, 6–1, 6–4.

Seeds

Draw

References 
 Main draw

Reinert Open - Doubles
Reinert Open